Marvin Mariche (born July 1, 2004) is an American soccer player who plays as a winger for USL Championship club North Carolina FC via the North Carolina FC academy.

Club career
Mariche joined the North Carolina FC academy in 2018, where he played before signing an academy contract with the club's USL League One side for the 2021 season. He made his debut on July 21, 2021, appearing as an injury-time substitute during a 4–0 win over Richmond Kickers. Mariche also appeared for North Carolina FC U23 in the USL League Two during the 2021 season.

Career statistics

References

2004 births
Living people
American soccer players
Association football forwards
North Carolina FC U23 players
North Carolina FC players
USL League One players
USL League Two players
Soccer players from North Carolina
Sportspeople from North Carolina
21st-century American people